Fernando Carlos de Paul Lanciotti (born April 25, 1991 in Álvarez, Argentina) is an Argentine-born Chilean professional footballer who plays as a goalkeeper for Chilean Primera División club Colo-Colo.

Biography 
At the age of 17 he made the decision to go to live in Chile with the ambition of playing professionally. He arrived in Chile through two representatives who are Pablo Tallarico and Clemente, who were the same that at the time brought Diego Osella and many players who achieved the promotion in 2009. He obtained the Chilean nationality in his passage through San Luis de Quillota.

Career
As a child he started playing as a midfielder in his native Alvarez, although he lasted only a year in that position. The next season began to try luck as a goalkeeper.

He made his professional debut in 2010 playing for San Luis de Quillota, when he was only 19, in a match against Huachipato, replacing the suspended Luciano Palos. The following year he would play more games, both in the First B and in the Chile Cup. In 2012, he would grab the starter's jersey in the Quillotano team, having outstanding participation in the fight for the promotion in the season 2013/14 (losing in the final phase against Barnechea), fact that would finally achieve a year later. His good campaign in the 2014/15 tournament attracted the interest of the University of Chile. The transfer to the university club became official on July 7, 2016.

Honours

Club
San Luis de Quillota
 Primera B de Chile (1): 2014–15

Universidad de Chile
 Primera División de Chile (1): 2017–C

Notes

External links
 
 

1991 births
Living people
Chilean footballers
Chile international footballers
Argentine footballers
Argentine emigrants to Chile
San Luis de Quillota footballers
Universidad de Chile footballers
Everton de Viña del Mar footballers
Colo-Colo footballers
Expatriate footballers in Chile
Chilean Primera División players
Primera B de Chile players
Association football goalkeepers
Naturalized citizens of Chile
Sportspeople from Santa Fe Province
Argentine people of French descent